Carmelite water is an alcoholic extract of lemon balm and other herbs. It was initially crafted in the 14th century by Carmelite nuns from the Abbey of St Just, and was commercialized under the name Eau de Carmes. It is used as an herbal tonic and toilet water.

See also 
 Klosterfrau Melissengeist

References

Toiletry
Perfumes
French liqueurs
Herbal liqueurs